Suleiman bin Abdullah Al Sheikh (1785 – October 1818) was a religious scholar in the Emirate of Diriyah and one of the grandsons of Muhammad ibn Abd al-Wahhab, founder of the Wahhabi movement. He was the author of al Dalail fi Hukm Muwalat Ahl al Ishrak.

Biography
Suleiman was born in 1785 into the Al Sheikh family, and his father was Abdullah bin Muhammad, a son of Muhammad ibn Abd al-Wahhab. Suleiman was a religious scholar like his father, uncles and grandfather and served as the qadi of Diriyah. 

Following the capture of Hejaz region by the Emirate of Diriyah in 1802–1803 Suleiman requested the ulema in the region to adopt the Wahhabi approach which was not accepted by them. Then, they were declared by Suleiman as apostates. During the battles between the forces of the Emirate and the Egyptian-Ottoman troops Suleiman was one of the defenders of Diriyah. For him it was not an ordinary battle between two political forces with conflicting interests, but between believers and non-believers or infidels. Abdullah issued several fatwas to express how Wahhabis should behave against those who did not follow Wahhabi belief. In these fatwas Suleiman also outlined the conditions about visiting the lands of infidels. He argued that Wahhabi visitors should overtly practice their religion in such places and that they should not have close relations with infidels while visiting their land. 

One month after the capture of Diriyah by the Egyptian forces led by Ibrahim Pasha, son of Muhammad Ali, in October 1818 Suleiman was killed by them. Because Suleiman did not accept their supremacy which he regarded as the submission to kufr.

Views
Suleiman was the first Wahhabi cleric noteworthy for introducing a novel approach to Takfir, based on re-conceptualising the works of Ibn Abd al-Wahhab and Ibn Taymiyyah, in the context of Ottoman-Saudi wars. He laid the theological instructions for declaring Muslims who did not adhere to Wahhabi beliefs as apostates. These treatises would set the foundational principles for the Takfiri discourse of the 19th century ideologues of classical Wahhabism. Sulayman's works served as a manual for later Wahhabi scholars to make sense of the major tenets of Muhammad ibn Abd al-Wahhab. Based on Sulayman's approach, classical Wahhabi scholars would formulate a novel doctrine of Takfir that expanded beyond the traditional paradigm of early Wahhabis and excommunicated most of the political opponents of the Second Saudi state.

He suggested that true believers should not hesitate to show their hostility against the people having different religious beliefs. His view was just a reproduction of the approach that had existed in Islam, particularly among some Kharijite and Shiite groups, since the seventh century which emphasized the difference between true and false religion and banned all interaction with infidels. Here, infidels refer to Muslims from different religious traditions. 

The views of Suleiman bin Abdullah were frequently adopted by his cousin, Abdul Rahman bin Hasan, and other religious scholars during the second Saudi State, or Emirate of Najd. His views were also used by the Ikhwan leaders in the late 1920s just before their revolt against King Abdulaziz as a justification for their resistance to him. King Abdulaziz argued that Suleiman's views should be taken into consideration in the related context and period of time.

References
 

18th-century Muslim scholars of Islam
19th-century Muslim scholars of Islam
1785 births
1818 deaths
Arab Sunni Muslim scholars of Islam
Saudi Arabian Wahhabists